William Tucker (January 7, 1588– February 17, 1643-44) settled in Jamestown of the Colony of Virginia in the early 17th century. He was a military commander. In May 1623, he offered a toast in a meeting with members of the Powhatan tribe. The wine that they had been given was a poisonous cocktail prepared by Dr. John Potts. It killed 200 Native Americans and another 50 were slain. He owned land with his brothers-in-law and was a member of the House of Burgesses, a commission of the peace, and was appointed to the Council.

Personal life
William Tucker was born in Cornwall on January 7, 1588 or in 1589. In 1610, he sailed on the Mary & James to Virginia. Tucker was married to Mary Thompson, who was born in 1599. Her father was Robert Thompson of Watton-at-Stone, Hertfordshire and her nephew was John Thompson, 1st Baron Haversham. 

She sailed with her brothers—William, George and Paul—on George and arrived in the colony in 1623. Tucker paid for the passage of his wife's brothers, for which he received 150 acres. In 1624 or 1625, their daughter Elizabeth was born. They also had William, John, Roger, and Memory. He died on February 17, 1643-44 or in England, likely before 1640.

Career
He was a planter with 800 acres in Kecoughtan (later Elizabeth City). In 1617, he paid for the transportation of two men to the colony. He traveled to and from England during trading voyages, including in 1618, 1630, 1632, and 1633. Harris stated that "he was a shrewd and hard man of business". 

Tucker was one of the first subscribers of the Virginia Company. On June 20, 1619, he was elected to represent Kecoughtan for the first General Assembly of Virginia. He was a member of the Colony of Virginia in 1620. In 1623 and 1634, Tucker was a member of the House of Burgesses. Called Captain William Tucker, he was an envoy to the Pamunkey Native Americans for the colony. 

On March 22, 1622, 347 or more colonists were killed during an Indian massacre. About one-sixth of the colonists had died. Approximately 20 women were taken from Martin's Hundred, a 20,000-acre  plantation and put into "great slavery". Settlements and plantations were set on fire by the Native Americas. The colonists were dazed by the damaged and focused their efforts on survival and retribution. They attacked Powhatan villages. Tucker was a military leader during this period.

Following the massacre of 1622, there were frequent attacks by Native Americans. So much so that people were unable to plant their crops. Tucker and others were given the responsibility to ensure the safety of people in their appointed areas. Tucker's area included Kecoughtan, Newport News and Elizabeth City. Measures included moving people from outlying areas, ensuring means to protect the settlement, and protecting areas with palisades around settlement.

In May 1623, plans were made with Opchanacanough to negotiate peace and the release of the missing women. He released Mistress Boyse as a good faith gesture, with the implied message that he would negotiate for the release of the remaining women. Captain Tucker and a group of musketeers met with Opechancanough and members of a Powhatan village along the Potomac River on May 22. In preparation for the event, Dr. John Potts prepared poisoned wine. Captain Tucker and others offered ceremonial toasts and 200 Powhatans died after drinking the wine. Another 50 people were killed. Opechancanough escaped, but a number of tribal leaders were killed. The English retaliated by attacking and burning down Powhatan villages. Tribal members and the captive women fled the English attacks. They also were hungry due to lost corn crops. Three of the women included Jane Dickenson and Mistress Jeffries, the wife of Nathaniel Jeffries, who died in the massacre.

Before 1623 and on March 4, 1626, he was appointed to the Council. He was a member of the Virginia General Assembly in 1625. In September 1632, he became the commission of the peace.

Indentured servants
He held two black indentured servants, Isabell and Anthoney, who were among the first Africans in Virginia, arriving between 1619 and 1624, when their son William Tucker was born. He was the first African American child to be born in the Thirteen Colonies. He had 17 servants. In 1625, he owned three African slaves. At that time, there was a total of 20 servants or slaves of African descent in the colony.

Land grants
Tucker entered into a land grant with his three of his brothers-in-law, William, Paul and George Thompson. They were part of his “muster” of 1624 to 1625. He was among a group that included William and Maurice Thompson in a joint land grant in 1636.

Notes

References

1642 deaths
People from Elizabeth City County, Virginia
People from Hampton, Virginia
English emigrants